The Penland School of Craft ("Penland" and formerly "Penland School of Crafts") is an Arts and Crafts educational center located in the Blue Ridge Mountains in Spruce Pine, North Carolina, about 50 miles from Asheville.

History

The school was founded in the 1920s in the isolated mountain town of Penland, North Carolina. In 1923, Lucy Morgan (1889–1981), a teacher at the Appalachian School who had recently learned to weave at Berea College, created an association to teach the craft to local women so they could earn income from their homes. The center, called Penland Weavers and Potters, provided instruction, looms, and materials. Local volunteers built a cabin and then a larger hall. In 1929, Penland was officially founded as the Penland School of Handicrafts after Edward F. Worst, a weaving expert and author of the Foot Power Loom Weaving, visited the school to provide weaving instruction. Worst added classes in basketry and pottery.

Bill Brown, who took over in 1962 after Morgan, created a resident artist program and expanded the number and length of courses. There are 51 buildings on 400 acres. Penland buildings were designed primarily by North Carolinian architects, including Frank Harmond and Cannon Architects in Raleigh, North Carolina and Dixon Weinstein Architects in Chapel Hill.

The school campus was added to the National Register of Historic Places in 2003 as the Penland School Historic District. The district encompasses 31 contributing buildings, 1 contributing site, and 3 contributing structures. The district is characterized by one- and two-story frame farmhouses dating from the turn of the 20th century, associated agricultural outbuildings, and 
Rustic Revival style log buildings. Notable buildings include the Colonial Revival style Lily Loom House and Pines; the Craft Cabin; Homer Hall; Ridgeway; and Beacon Church.

Overview
, Penland offered Spring, Summer, and Fall workshops in craft disciplines, including weaving and dyeing, bead work, glassblowing, pottery, paper making, metalworking, and woodworking. It also offers fine arts subjects, such as printmaking, painting, and photography. Workshops are taught by visiting American and international artists and professors, a tradition that started with Worst and until he died in 1949. Academic degrees are not awarded by Penland, but students can receive college credit through Western Carolina University (WCU). There are about 1200 people who study at Penland each year.

Penland holds an annual Community Day in early March, when the school's studios are open and visitors can work on a small project with the help of the artists.

An exhibition of works created at Penland was held at the Mint Museum.

References

Further reading 
 Bonnie Willis Ford. 1931 Weaving Institute at Penland Hunter Library Library Digital Collections, Western Carolina University
 Bonnie Willis Ford. 1932 Weaving Institute at Penland Hunter Library Library Digital Collections, Western Carolina University 
 Appalachian Industrial School in the Mountains of North Carolina. Hunter Library Library Digital Collections, Western Carolina University 
 Appalachian Mountain Community Centre. Hunter Library Library Digital Collections, Western Carolina University 
 Records at Huntington Library Digital Collection. Hunter Library Library Digital Collections, Western Carolina University
McLaughlin, Jean, ed. Inspired: Life in Penland's Resident Artist and Core Fellowship Programs. Penland: Penland School of Crafts, 2016.
McLaughlin, Jean W., Mint Museum of Craft + Design, and Penland School of Crafts. The Nature of Craft and the Penland Experience. 1st ed. New York: Lark Books, 2004.
Morgan, Lucy and LeGette Blythe. Gift from the Hills: Miss Lucy Morgan's Story of Her Unique Penland School. First ed. New York: Bobbs-Merrill, 1958.

External links 
 Penland website
 The Penland Experience

Art museums and galleries in North Carolina
Art schools in North Carolina
Crafts educators
Education in Mitchell County, North Carolina
Education in North Carolina
Educational institutions established in 1929
Tourist attractions in Mitchell County, North Carolina
School buildings on the National Register of Historic Places in North Carolina
Historic districts on the National Register of Historic Places in North Carolina
Colonial Revival architecture in North Carolina
Buildings and structures in Mitchell County, North Carolina
National Register of Historic Places in Mitchell County, North Carolina
Artist's retreats
1929 establishments in North Carolina
Glassmaking schools